Primera División de Costa Rica (Costa Rica First Division) is a Costa Rican football tournament composed of two short tournaments that take up the entire year to determine the champion of Costa Rican football.

Apertura 2004

Group stage

Playoffs

Clausura 2005

Group stage

Playoffs

Final

 

Liga FPD seasons
1
Costa